Gavin David Free (born 23 May 1988) is an English actor, director, cinematographer, and internet personality. He is best known for his work at Rooster Teeth—where he formerly served as creative director—featuring in many of their projects, including the Achievement Hunter gaming division. He directed season 7 of Red vs. Blue, as well as its miniseries Relocated.

Free is also known as the creator and co-host of the YouTube-based web series The Slow Mo Guys, alongside his friend Daniel Gruchy. The series features slow-motion footage of various stunts and experiments, garnering  over 2.2 billion views since its launch in 2010. In April 2011, the channel was voted the winner of YouTube's On The Rise program. In September 2012, their episode involving crushing watermelons was featured on The Tonight Show. Free has appeared alongside Gruchy in the annual YouTube Rewind series from 2013 to 2017. Free was nominated for a Webby Award in the Best Web Personality/Host (Online Film & Video) category for his work on The Slow Mo Guys on 5 April 2016.

His acting roles include Woody in Lazer Team and its sequel, Vav in the animated comedy series X-Ray and Vav, and Scarlet David in RWBY. He is also known for his slow motion cinematography work for films, including Hot Fuzz (2007), Sherlock Holmes: A Game of Shadows (2011), Snow White and the Huntsman (2012), and Dredd (2012). Free has also worked on slow-motion footage for the BBC show Top Gear. At the 2016 Streamy Awards, Free won for Cinematography.

Early life
Free was born in Thame in Oxfordshire where he attended Lord Williams's School.

In 2006, he joined Green Door Films, the first production house in Europe to use Phantom digital high-speed cameras as a source of slow motion, working as a data technician and camera operator. He has worked on adverts and music videos for U2, Enter Shikari, Klaxons, Kasabian, The Chemical Brothers, X-Press 2, and the "Everybody Hurts" charity single.

Free also worked at his local Waitrose, where he met Daniel Gruchy.

Career

Red vs. Blue and Slow Mo Guys: 2009–2010
In 2009, he was hired by Austin,-Texas-based Rooster Teeth Productions to direct the seventh season of their machinima series Red vs. Blue. Free also directed its mini-series Relocated. He acted in Rooster Teeth's comedy mini-series Captain Dynamic and began appearing in Rooster Teeth Shorts the same year.

In 2010, he created The Slow Mo Guys along with friend Daniel Gruchy in order to get a work visa. The Slow Mo Guys consists largely of various objects being filmed using Free's Phantom high-speed cameras. , their YouTube channel has garnered over 2.2 billion views and 14.2 million subscribers. In April 2011, the channel was voted the winner of YouTube's On The Rise program, which highlights up-and-coming YouTube partners on the homepage. In September 2012, they were featured on The Tonight Show. In February 2013, Free announced that The Slow Mo Guys had been picked up by Rooster Teeth and that further episodes of the series would be released on Rooster Teeth's website, as well as the series' existing YouTube channel.

On 23 February 2015, Free and Gruchy created a partner channel to The Slo Mo Guys, The Slo Mo Guys 2, as a channel for "laid back 'out of labcoats' content that doesn't fit on the main channel" As of February 2021, the channel has 41.8 million views and 831k subscribers.

Rooster Teeth and Achievement Hunter: 2012–present
Free joined Achievement Hunter (a video gaming division of Rooster Teeth founded by Geoff Ramsey and Jack Pattillo) in 2008 as a contract host before becoming one of the main six hosts in 2012. He is one of the most prolific employees on the site, regularly appearing in their Let's Play series of videos, its podcast Off Topic, and tutorials of how to get achievements and find easter eggs in video games.

In May 2013, Free began starring as a "lab rat" in the Rooster Teeth series Immersion, replacing Geoff Ramsey and Gus Sorola. In Immersion, Free must test video concepts in real life alongside friend and co-worker Michael Jones. He was a contestant in the second season of Rooster Teeth's gaming show The Gauntlet in 2013. Free has had two cameo appearances in Barenaked Ladies music videos for their songs "Odds Are" (2013) and "Did I Say That Out Loud?" (2014). In the latter video, he is portrayed as accidentally lighting himself on fire when trying to play a song for his domestic partner Meg Turney, which subsequently goes viral. Free and The Slow Mo Guys co-star Daniel Gruchy appeared in YouTube Rewind in 2013, playing themselves being pulled by an RV, itself a nod to Breaking Bad, while an explosion goes off behind them. They both returned for the YouTube Rewinds from 2014 to 2017.

Free began starring in the Rooster Teeth animated superhero comedy web series X-Ray and Vav in November 2014. He voiced Vav alongside former Achievement Hunter employee Ray Narvaez, Jr., who voices X-Ray. The season was renewed for a second season, which premiered in July 2015. That same year, he appeared in Rooster Teeth's murder mystery comedy series Ten Little Roosters as a fictionalized version of himself and was a contestant on the improvised comedy series @midnight on Comedy Central.

In 2015, Free and Rooster Teeth co-founder Burnie Burns hosted multiple episodes of the hypothetical scenario series Million Dollars, But..., in which each person comes up with a typically difficult scenario; for example, having to date Adolf Hitler for a year — which the cast comically re-enact — for which they will be given a million dollars. The pilot episode premiered on 21 May 2015, with the series continuing on 9 July 2015. He was a reactor on the web series YouTubers React in August 2015. Free became the creative director of Rooster Teeth in October 2015, replacing Burnie Burns who was then promoted to chief creative officer. However, he stepped down in early 2016, wanting to "dedicate his time in 2016 to The Slow Mo Guys."

In 2016, Free starred as Woody in Rooster Teeth's science fiction action comedy film Lazer Team. The film was released theatrically on 27 January 2016. It received mixed to positive reviews from critics at film festival showings and upon its release. He joined the voice cast of the anime web series RWBY as Scarlet David for its third volume.

On 5 April 2016, Free was nominated for a Webby Award in the Best Web Personality/Host (Online Film & Video) category for his work on The Slow Mo Guys. At the 2016 Streamy Awards Free won for Cinematography.

Personal life

Free has been in a relationship with Meg Turney since 2013. As of March 2019, he is now a permanent resident of the United States.

On 26 January 2018, an armed man broke into the couple's Austin home armed with a handgun, firing one shot while the two hid in a closet and contacted authorities. The suspect was confronted by police in the driveway and after an exchange of gunfire was killed by one of the officers. The gunman, an obsessed fan of Turney's, had driven 11 hours from Albuquerque, New Mexico, to the couple's home. He was reportedly resentful of Free's fame and relationship. Free and Turney were unharmed in the incident.

Filmography

Web

Film

Television

Video games

Non-performance credits

Podcasts

References

External links

 
 

1988 births
21st-century British screenwriters
English cinematographers
English emigrants to the United States
English male actors
English male web series actors
English people of Italian descent
English YouTubers
Living people
People from Thame
Rooster Teeth people